Pectinimura brahmanica is a moth in the family Lecithoceridae. It is found in Papua New Guinea.

The length of the forewings is 5–5.5 mm. The forewings and uniform covered with yellowish-brown scales, with broad, orange-white band along the costa from the base to the apex. There is a round blackish discal spot at the middle and another larger one at the end of the cell, as well as blackish spots along the termen. The costa is nearly straight, with dark- brown scales basally.

Etymology
The species name is derived from the Brahman Mission in Madang, the type locality.

References

Moths described in 2011
brahmanica